Pickering Nook is a small village in County Durham, in England. It is situated a few miles north of Annfield Plain and Stanley, on the A692 between Consett and Gateshead.

References

Villages in County Durham